Martyr Immortal is the second studio album by the American rock band Pulling Teeth. The album was released on November 27, 2007 through Deathwish Inc.

Track listing
 "With Avarice" – 1:30
 "Dead Is Dead" – 0:40
 "Clipped Wings" – 1:23
 "Stonethrowers" – 1:23
 "Shiteaters" – 1:50
 "Sick and Tired" – 2:22
 "Rains" – 0:58
 "Basically Dead" – 1:13
 "Martyr Immortal (Mori VincentOmnes)" – 3:49
 "Black Skies" – 2:56
 "Ashes and Dust" – 0:22
 "Dismissed in Time" – 7:17

References

Deathwish Inc. albums
Pulling Teeth (band) albums
2007 albums